Mant, also Mat, is a town and Tehsil in Mathura district of Uttar Pradesh, India. Mant is situated 23 kilometers (14.3 miles) from the city of Mathura and 45 kilometers (28 miles) from Khair City. It belongs to the Agra Division.

Geography 

Mant has 201 villages as of the 2011 Census of India.

Politics
Mant (Assembly constituency) is the Vidhan Sabha constituency. Mathura (Lok Sabha constituency) is the parliamentary constituency.

Transportation 
Mant is connected to Bajna - Mathura Road and Yamuna Expressway.

See also 
 
Mathura district.
Neemgaon

References  

Mathura district
Tehsils of Uttar Pradesh